Amanda Marie Dennis (born May 25, 1998) is an American former professional soccer player who last played as a goalkeeper for Houston Dash of the National Women's Soccer League (NWSL).

Early life 
Dennis was born in San Diego.

College career 
Dennis played for Penn State Nittany Lions women's soccer team.

Club career 
Dennis signed for Houston Dash in January 2020. She retired from professional soccer in November 2021.

International career 
Dennis is a former United States youth international.

Honors 
Houston Dash
 NWSL Challenge Cup: 2020

References

External links 
 
 Penn State profile

1998 births
Living people
Soccer players from San Diego
American women's soccer players
Women's association football goalkeepers
Penn State Nittany Lions women's soccer players
Houston Dash players
National Women's Soccer League players